USS Moccasin (ID-1322) was a United States Navy refrigerated cargo ship in commission from 1918-1919. She was the third ship to carry her name.

Moccasin was built as the German commercial passenger-cargo ship SS Prinz Joachim in 1903 at Flensburg, Germany, by Flensburger Schiffbau-Gesellschaft for the Hamburg America Line. When the United States entered World War I on the side of the Allied in April 1917, the United States Government seized her and placed her under the control of the United States Shipping Board (USSB) for use during World War I. Renamed SS Moccasin, she entered service as an American civilian cargo ship. Late in 1917, the United States Army chartered her.

The U.S. Navy acquired Moccasin at New York City on 19 February 1918 for World War I use as a refrigerated cargo ship. She was assigned the naval registry Identification Number (Id. No.) 1322 and commissioned as USS Moccasin on 26 February 1918.

Service history
Assigned to the Naval Overseas Transportation Service, Moccasin departed New York City on 14 March 1918 with a convoy for Europe, arriving at Bordeaux, France on 13 April to unload her cargo of frozen food.

Moccasin continued to operate as a refrigerator ship, making cross‑Atlantic runs to Europe from New York, until she decommissioned on 2 June 1919. She was transferred to the USSB the same day.

On 15 August 1919 the USSB opened bids for repair and conversion to oil fuel and awarded the contract to Tietjen & Lang Dry Dock Company with work completed on 28 December 1919. The USSB placed the ship under management of the Munson Steamship Line for passenger and freight service to the east coast of South America. After reconditioning and repair after an accident in New York the ship was allocated in 1920 by the USSB for service with the Porto Rico Steamship Company under the name Porto Rico.

References

 
Department of the Navy: Naval Historical Center Online Library of Selected Images:  Civilian Ships: Moccasin (Passenger-Cargo Steamer, 1903). Originally named Prinz Joachim. Served as USS Moccasin (ID # 1322) in 1918-1919
NavSource Online: Section Patrol Craft Photo Archive: Moccasin (ID 1322)

Ships of the Hamburg America Line
World War I cargo ships of the United States
Ships built in Flensburg
1903 ships
Cargo ships of the United States Navy